Gabriele Wetzko (later Hartung then Frischke then Kühne , born 24 August 1954 in Leipzig) is a former German swimmer. Born in Leipzig, East Germany, she competed for East Germany in the 1968 and 1972 Summer Olympics.

At the 1968 Olympics she competed in the 200 m, 400 m and 4 × 100 m freestyle events. The 4 × 100 m freestyle East German team of Gabriele Wetzko, Uta Schmuck, Gabriele Perthes and Roswitha Krause won a silver medal.

At the 1970 European Aquatics Championships in Barcelona, she won four gold medals: in the 100 m and 200 m freestyle, as well as in the 4×100 medley and 4×100 m freestyle relays.

At the 1972 Olympics she competed in the 100 m freestyle, 4×100 m medley relay and 4×100 m freestyle relay, where her team, once again, won the silver medal.

In 1973, she completed her swimming career and began studying for a medical degree, later receiving a degree in economics as well. She married the swimmer Wilfried Hartung on 15 September 1973 but they divorced soon after.

References

1954 births
Living people
Olympic swimmers of East Germany
Swimmers at the 1968 Summer Olympics
Swimmers at the 1972 Summer Olympics
Olympic silver medalists for East Germany
Swimmers from Leipzig
World record setters in swimming
German female freestyle swimmers
European Aquatics Championships medalists in swimming
Recipients of the Patriotic Order of Merit in silver
Medalists at the 1972 Summer Olympics
Medalists at the 1968 Summer Olympics
Olympic silver medalists in swimming